The Colorado Division of Water Resources, also known as the Office of the State Engineer, administers water resources in the American state of Colorado. Part of the Department of Natural Resources, the agency is headed by the State Engineer.

Mission

According to their mission statement, the agency

 administers water rights, issues water well permits, represents Colorado in interstate water compact proceedings, monitors streamflow and water use, approves construction and repair of dams and performs dam safety inspections, issues licenses for well drillers and assures the safe and proper construction of water wells, and maintains numerous databases of Colorado water information.

See also

 Colorado Department of Natural Resources
 Colorado Water Conservation Board
 Colorado Water Quality Control Division
 Colorado Water Trust
 Colorado Water Courts
 Water in Colorado

References

External links
 Colorado Division of Water Resources official site
 Colorado Surface Water Conditions, official site

Water in Colorado
State agencies of Colorado